Fantastic Locations: The Frostfell Rift is an adventure module for the 3.5 edition of the Dungeons & Dragons fantasy role-playing game.

Plot summary
Fantastic Locations: The Frostfell Rift presents several encounters involving the Frostfell.  Locations include Hailstorm Tower, the Caves of Chaos, and the Frostfell Rift.

Publication history
Fantastic Locations: The Frostfell Rift was written by Ari Marmell, and was published in December 2006. Cover art was by Izzy, with interior art by David Griffith.

Reception

References

Dungeons & Dragons modules
Role-playing game supplements introduced in 2006